Hugh White  (born 1953) is an Emeritus Professor of Strategic Studies at the Strategic and Defence Studies Centre of the Australian National University in Canberra, Australia, long-time defence and intelligence analyst, and author who has published works on military strategy and international relations. He was Deputy Secretary for Strategy and Intelligence in the Australian Department of Defence from 1995 until 2000 and was the inaugural Director of the Australian Strategic Policy Institute (ASPI). His 2019 book How to Defend Australia attracted national attention after raising the proposition of re-examining the proposition of an independently nuclear-armed Australia.

Education and early career (1970s–2000)
White studied philosophy at the University of Melbourne and the University of Oxford in the 1970s.  At Oxford he read for the B.Phil, and was awarded the John Locke Prize in Mental Philosophy in 1978.  In the 1980s he was variously a journalist for the Sydney Morning Herald newspaper, an intelligence analyst at the Office of National Assessments, an advisor to Minister for Defence Kim Beazley, and the International Adviser to Prime Minister Bob Hawke. In 1995 he was appointed Deputy Secretary for Strategy and Intelligence in the Department of Defence. During his tenure he was involved in the preparation of the 2000 Defence White Paper, entitled Our Future Defence Forces, published by the Howard Government. Its central conclusions were that Australia must maintain a self-reliant defence force, retain control of its maritime territories and "seek to attack hostile forces as far from our shores as possible". He has since described himself as the White Paper's "principal author".

Academic career (2000–present)
As an academic in the area of strategic studies White has become prominent within Australia. Crikey's Power Index of influential thinkers in Australia ranked him number seven in 2012. In the early part of the 2010s, White gained significant coverage in the Australian media with regular commentary in The Australian newspaper, the Sydney Morning Herald, and numerous television appearances. Much of his intellectual work is presented in articles written for The Strategist since 2012.

In 2010, White published The China Choice: Why We Should Share Power. This work gained significant national attention as well as favourable commentary globally including from journalist and strategist Robert D. Kaplan, the New York Times, the Financial Times, and the New York Review of Books. The central argument made in White's book is that there should be a concert of powers in Asia as there was in Europe in the 19th century. However, he believes that Australia's strategic hedging cannot last and that policy makers will one day have to choose whether they are aligned with the US or with China.

In The China Choice, White argues the Vietnam War ultimately benefited the Asian region because it demonstrated the lengths the US would go to secure its supremacy over China. White has argued publicly that Australia needs to dramatically increase its maritime capabilities in order for Australia to avoid becoming a small power in Asia.

In more recent times White advocated for a reconsideration of the Abbott Government's preference for a deal with Japan for the construction of Australia's next generation submarine fleet. The basis for his belief was the negative implications on Australia-China relations, so he instead advocated for deals with France or Germany. White has also been critical of the Rudd and Gillard Government's escalation of Australian involvement in the War in Afghanistan which he argues resulted in increased casualties. He was also critical of Prime Minister Tony Abbott's reliance on national security during his term of office.

White believes that Australia is a key player in the Asian region, but that Australian governments routinely believe Chinese governments are preoccupied with economic interests when China is determined to redistribute regional power in its favour.

Criticism
White has most often been criticised for his bullish outlook in defence matters, especially in relation to armaments. Writing in the Australian Review, political scientist Graham Cheeseman argued the authors of the 2000 Defence White Paper was "more about politics than policy, driven in large measure by the desires and vested interests of the major actors within the defence establishment and those, primarily within industry and government, who stand to gain from the $160 billion to be spent on Australia’s defence over the coming decade". He also believed the White Paper was much more aggressive than its preoccupation with peaceful solutions was designed to suggest. This same criticism was taken up by ASPI commentator Peter Jennings. A strategist at the University of New South Wales at the Australian Defence Force Academy, James Goldrick, argued in 2015 that White's bellicosity must be measured against the price of war, stating that "[w]hat we have to be sure [about] is that the end justifies the means".

Other commentators have argued that White exaggerates the threat posed by China in the Asian region. Professor Paul Dibb from the Australian National University argued that White has overstated the ability of China to assert its power.

Awards and recognition 
White was made an Officer of the Order of Australia in the 2014 Queen's Birthday Honours for "distinguished service to international affairs, through strategic defence studies as an analyst, academic and adviser to government, and to public administration".

In 2020 White was elected a Fellow of the Academy of the Social Sciences in Australia.

In February 2022 White was awarded the honorary degree of Doctor of Letters [D.Litt] by ANU for his 'contributions to the study of international affairs, strategic studies and defence issues as an analyst, academic, public servant and adviser to government'.

Bibliography 

 
 
 
 The China Choice: Why America Should Share Power, Black, Melbourne, Australia. 2012.
 Without America: Australia in the New Asia, Quarterly Essay No 68, Black: Collingwood, Victoria. 2017.
 Dawn of the post-American order in Asia, Straits Times, December 2017.
 .
 How to Defend Australia, La Trobe University Press, Melbourne. 2019.   
 Sleepwalk to War: Australia's Unthinking Alliance with America, Quarterly Essay No 86, Black: Collingwood, Victoria. 2022.

References

External links 
 Hugh White and the China Choice

1953 births
Living people
Alumni of the University of Oxford
Academic staff of the Australian National University
Australian writers
Quarterly Essay people
University of Melbourne alumni
Officers of the Order of Australia
Fellows of the Academy of the Social Sciences in Australia